Barzy-sur-Marne (literally Barzy on Marne) is a commune in the department of Aisne in the Hauts-de-France region of northern France.

Geography
Barzy-sur-Marne is located some 15 km east by northeast of Château-Thierry and 35 km southwest of Rheims. It can be accessed on the D320 road from Jaulgonne in the west passing through the commune and the village curving south to Passy-sur-Marne. Apart from the village there are two hamlets: Marcilly, and Rosay both located on the D320 road. Some 70% of the commune in the north is heavily forested with the balance consisting of farmland.

The western border of the commune is formed by the Marne river which flows from the south curving west. One small stream south of the village flows into the Marne.

The commune lies within the Appellation d'origine contrôlée (AOC) zone for "Champagne of Aisne".

Neighbouring communes and villages

History
In the 16th century, the people depended on the Duchess of Vendôme. The three separate hamlets composing the village had once each had a port on the Marne to transport stone.

In 1923 the capital of the commune of Barzy-sur-Marne was transferred from Barzy-sur-Marne to the hamlet of Marcilly which became the capital of the commune but this transfer was done without changing the name of the commune following the Decree of 23 October 1923.

Administration

List of mayors of Barzy-sur-Marne

Population

Sites and Monuments

The commune has two sites that are registered as historical monuments:
The Chateau Park at 50 Rue Saint-Eloi
The Church of Saint Eloi (13th century)

Other sites of interest
A Lavoir (Public laundry)
An illustration of the fable The Fox and the Stork in the village square at Barzy-sur-Marne

See also
Communes of the Aisne department

References

External links
Barzy-sur-Marne on the old National Geographic Institute website 
Barzy-sur-Marne on the Official website of the Union of the Canton of Condé-en-Brie 
Bell Towers website 
40000 Bell Towers website 
Barzy-sur-Marne on Géoportail, National Geographic Institute (IGN) website 
Barcy on the 1750 Cassini Map

Communes of Aisne